Gare de Chalon-sur-Saône is the railway station serving the town Chalon-sur-Saône, Saône-et-Loire department, eastern France. It is situated on the Paris–Marseille railway, at kilometre post 382.150 from Paris Gare de Lyon, and at an altitude of 179 m.

The original station in Chalon was built in the centre as a terminus. To avoid trains reversing direction, a bypass containing a new station was planned. In 1893 the old station was closed and all traffic began to serve the modern station.

Services

The station is served by regional trains towards Beaune, Dijon, Mâcon, Lyon and Montchanin.

References

Railway stations in Saône-et-Loire